Riyadh Roberts (born Riyadh Emandien; 23 December 1991), known professionally as YoungstaCPT (or simply YoungCPT or Youngsta Kaapstad), is a South African rapper, lyricist and songwriter. He is known for incorporating details about his Cape Malay culture and his Cape Town roots in his music. YoungstaCPT has been described as "one of the most outspoken South African emcees of this generation". He released his debut solo album 3T (Things Take Time) in April 2018, which won Album of The Year at the 2019 South African Hip Hop Awards. Prior to the release of 3T, YoungstaCPT had released 30 mixtapes, six extended plays and two collaborative albums since his debut in 2010.

In 2021, he landed his debut acting role on the second season of the Netflix series Blood & Water.

Selected discography

Studio albums 
 3T (2019)

Other projects
 The Cape and Good Dope (2016) – with Ganja Beatz
 Y?-Fi (2017) – with Maloon TheBoom
 Kaapstads Revenge (2017) – with J-Beatz
 How to Make It in South Africa (2017) with Loopsta
 Yungloon Taliboom (2018) – with Maloon TheBoom and Yungloon Taliboom
 To Be Continued (2018) – with Maloon TheBoom and Yungloon Taliboom

Personal life
YoungstaCPT is a Coloured Muslim of Cape Malay descent whose music is inspired by his Muslim roots and Cape Malay culture.

Awards and nominations

See also
List of South African musicians
Cape Coloureds

References 

1991 births
Living people
21st-century rappers
21st-century South African musicians
Cape Coloureds
South African hip hop musicians
South African Muslims
South African rappers
South African people of Malay descent
Musicians from Cape Town